Long intergenic non-protein coding RNA 346 is a protein that in humans is encoded by the LINC00346 gene.

References

Further reading